"Zou Bisou Bisou" (also performed as "Zoo Be Zoo Be Zoo") is a song written by Bill Shepherd and Alan Tew, and Michel Rivgauche for the lyrics of the French version. The song's origins stem from the Yé-yé movement with which an early version of the song was associated. Its theme is variously described as an open declaration of love and the joy of kissing.

"Zou Bisou Bisou" was Gillian Hills' first single in the summer of 1960. A French recording, titled "Zoo Be Zoo Be Zoo", was produced by George Martin and sung in English by Sophia Loren. Although most sources associate the origins of the song with Hills, New York claims that the songwriting credits make it more likely that Loren's version was the original.  Slate David Haglund notes that Hills' version is the best-known of the early recordings.

It was performed by Jessica Paré as Megan Draper in the Mad Men episode "A Little Kiss". The morning after its on-air performance on AMC, the song was released as a music download and as a vinyl special edition. Paré's on-air performance of the song was lip synced to a prior recording.

Swedish pop and soul singer Emilia Mitiku covered the song in 2013, on her album I Belong to You.

Background and production
Martin's production of "Zoo Be Zoo Be Zoo" was originally recorded by Sophia Loren as publicity associated with the film The Millionairess (1960) on the album Peter and Sophia. Several sources, including a posting at AMC's website, state that Hills did not produce her version, with Rivgauche's lyrics, until 1961, after Loren's October 1960 movie. Another version of the song, by Israeli-French performer Maya Casabianca, appeared on France's Billboard chart in September 1961. Additional cover versions have been produced by the Pennies and Kerstin Dahl.

Lionsgate Television released a music download edition of Paré's version at the iTunes Store as well as two vinyl editions made available online. It will also be released in the future on Amazon.com and in stores.   This version was produced by Matthew Weiner, Russell Ziecker, David Carbonara, and James T. Hill. Paré recorded her lyrics in a recording studio, working with Carbonara, and choreographed her routine with Marianne Ann Kellogg. The 7-inch vinyl version includes the B-side, "A Beautiful Mine" by RJD2, which is the theme music for the show. Weiner tracked down the song and had many objectives for Paré to achieve in the production of the song. Pare's version was used in Season 3 episode 2 of Emily in Paris.

Charts

Themes
Roughly translated from French to English "Zou Bisou Bisou" means "Oh! Kiss Kiss" or "Oh You Kiss Kiss".

After translating the song, Haglund claimed that the theme of the song is about ". . .openly declaring and displaying one's love, coming out from 'the bushes' where 'lovers glide stealthily' and feeling love 'everywhere'". The Huffington Post summarized the song more simply saying that it made the statement "about how kissing is fun". Slate noted that yé-yé singers were often "teenage girls who exuded a faux-innocent sexuality", which played on Megan Draper's "youthful sex appeal and the generation gap between Megan and Don".  Paré stated that, "Megan, who is younger and more naïve than Don, was 'unknowingly putting their intimate connection on the line' in front of their friends and co-workers'. . .'The reason that it's so awkward isn't that she was doing anything wrong, but because it's private'. . ."

Critical response to Mad Men scene
Numerous critics from prominent media outlets such as The Wall Street Journal, Slate, USA Today, Rolling Stone,  New York Daily News, Los Angeles Times, Chicago Sun-Times, CBS News, noted that the highlight of the 5th season premiere was Paré's performance of this song during Don Draper's surprise 40th birthday party, describing the performance and Paré as sexy, slinky, and sultry. Matthew Perpetua of Rolling Stone said that "Megan sings…for her husband, who can barely suppress his embarrassment and discomfort."

Erin Carlson of The Hollywood Reporter described Paré's performance as "bizarre, come-hither burlesque", noting that she "stunned partygoers who openly ogled her while the ad exec (Jon Hamm) squirmed with polite embarrassment."

The song's performance became a trending topic on Twitter.  Since the song was trending the entire following day, The Roots performed a brief rendition of a verse of the song as interstitial music the following night on Late Night with Jimmy Fallon. Despite the social media frenzy, the song did not crack the iTunes Top 100. On 14 April 2012, however, it did manage to reach the bottom position #100 of the Canadian Hot 100.

References

French-language songs
Song recordings produced by George Martin
1960 songs
2012 songs